Tatiana Borisovna Rachkova (born 14 January 1973) is a Russian former competitive figure skater who also represented the Unified Team and the Soviet Union. She is the 1992 Vienna Cup champion, 1992 Russian national bronze medalist, and placed 16th at the 1992 Winter Olympics.

She is now a skating instructor at the Chiller Ice Rinks in Columbus, Ohio, United States.

Results

References

 Tatiana Rachkova at Sports-reference
 Tatiana Rachkova (in Russian)

1973 births
Soviet female single skaters
Russian female single skaters
Olympic figure skaters of the Unified Team
Figure skaters at the 1992 Winter Olympics
Living people
Figure skaters from Moscow
Competitors at the 1990 Goodwill Games